Peder Sather (September 25, 1810 – December 28, 1886) was a Norwegian-born American banker who is best known for his legacy to the University of California, Berkeley. His widow, Jane K. Sather, donated money in his memory for two of the school's most famous landmarks. Sather Gate and Sather Tower, which is more commonly known as The Campanile, are both California Historical Landmarks which are registered  National Register of Historic Places.

Biography
Peder Pedersen Sæther was born in Odal, a traditional district in the county of Hedmark in eastern Norway, on the farm Nordstun Nedre Sæther (Sør-Odal). His parents were Peder Larsen and Mari Kristoffersdatter. Sæther was a fisherman before emigrating to New York City in about 1832. He entered the banking house of Drexel & Co. in Philadelphia and remained there until 1850.

Philadelphia banker  Francis Martin Drexel offered to assist Peder Sather and his business partner Edward W. Church in establishing a bank in San Francisco.  In 1850, Sather and Church moved to San Francisco and established the banking firm of Drexel, Sather & Church. From 1863, Peder Sather became the sole owner of the bank.  He went on to become one of California’s richest men. Upon his death, the Sather and Church banking firm was absorbed by the Bank of California. Peder Sather was a trustee of the College of California, which would later become the University of California, Berkeley.

Sather's first wife Sarah Thompson was born in 1808 in Connecticut and died in 1881. They had 4 children: Caroline Eugenia Sather, born in 1836, Josephine Frederikke Sather (married Bruguière), born in 1845, died when the White Star Line passenger liner SS Arabic was torpedoed on August 19, 1915. Mary Emma Sather, born about 1845 and Peder B. Sather, born about 1846.  Peder Sather was the maternal grandfather of photographer, Francis Bruguière.

Peder Sather married a second time, in 1882, the widow Jane Krom Read (1824-1911). Four years later, after her husband's death she donated money for the construction of Sather Gate and Sather Tower at UC Berkeley, both of which are named in his honor. She also created an endowment for the Sather Professorship of Classical Literature at the University.

Peder Sather Symposium
 The Peder Sather Symposium is a biennial event organized as a collaboration between the governments of Norway and Sweden and UC Berkeley. The stated goal of the symposium is to promote the understanding of political, economic, and cultural issues. It is designed to foster interdisciplinary discussion among scholars and policymakers on global and national issues of mutual concern.

Sather Classical Lectures
The Sather Classical Lectures are an annual presentation by a selected scholar (the Sather Professor) on topics from the Greek and Roman world of antiquity.   The lectures are usually about six in number, and are normally reprinted in book form. Among the distinguished appointees have been Lily Ross Taylor, Ronald Syme, William Bedell Stanford, John Myres, Brian Stock, and Herbert Weir Smyth.

See also
 Arabic Case
 Francis Bruguière
 Margaret Van Alen Bruguiére
 Peter Cooper Hewitt
 Sather Tower
 Sather programming language

References

Other sources
Dow, Sterling  (1965) Fifty Years of Sathers: The Sather Professorship of Classical Literature in the University of California, Berkeley (University of California Press)
Sveen, Karin   (2014)  The Immigrant and the University. Peder Sather and Gold Rush California (University of California Press)

Further reading
 Alexander, William Hardy  The Sather Classical Lectures (Classical Association of the Atlantic States. The Classical Weekly, Volume 48, No. 2  January 3, 1955)

External links
 
 
 
 
 

1810 births
1886 deaths
People from Sør-Odal
Norwegian emigrants to the United States
Norwegian bankers
American bankers
Norwegian philanthropists
History of San Francisco
19th-century American philanthropists
19th-century American businesspeople